Herbert Rudiger is (or was) an American radio technician who terrorized the city of Porto Alegre, in Brazil when placing several bombs in 1952 over the course of one month. Five people were known to be wounded by his bombs.

Bombings
Beginning in January 1952, bombs began to appear in the streets of Porto Alegre. One newspaper headline, titled "Bombas Misteriosas Explodindo Em Porto Alegre", was published on February 14, 1952. 

The devices were left at crowded places, or stuffed inside packages. One device exploded at the Viaduto Borges de Medeiros, and injured a man described as "poor", who disappearead without requesting medical assistance.

Investigation
Initially, the police attributed the bombings to Communists in the city, but ultimately they changed their version, attributing it to an unknown maniac, and in an attempt to calm down the population, they advised them to not open any packages. 

During this time, pranksters put false bombs in crowded streets, causing passers-by to ask if it was a bomb, and while police came to check it, people laughed because the bombs contained mere paper and fruits' papers.

Capture
In May 1952, Rudiger was fabricating a bomb in the workshop inside his house when it exploded, seriously wounding him and causing him to lost one of his vision. 

In the hospital, the 24-year-old, who was son of German parents, decided to confess to the police that he was the author of the bombings. He claimed his motive was fun he obtained with the sensationalism of the media. 

Rudiger told police he suffered from a psychosis, and that he looked for a psychiatrist surnamed Kern, but did not find a cure. According to him, he was tormented by his imaginations, and decided to create the bombs.

Victims
All of the victims listed here were not fatally injured:
Nelson Edmundo Lorenz
Wilmar Almeida
Nédio Martins da Silva
Darci Xavider de Souza
Aristeu Pedro da Costa

Aftermath
In July 1952 Rudiger appeared at court and confessed to the bombings and an inquiry was put.

References

1930s births
American male criminals
Bombers (people)
Living people
Serial bombers